Gustav Adolf Feodor Wilhelm Ludwig Mie (29 September 1868 – 13 February 1957) was a German physicist.

Life
Mie was born in Rostock, Mecklenburg-Schwerin, Germany in 1868. From 1886 he studied mathematics and physics at the University of Rostock. In addition to his major subjects, he also attended lectures in chemistry, zoology, geology, mineralogy and astronomy, as well as logic and metaphysics. In 1889 he continued his studies at the University of Heidelberg and received a doctoral degree in mathematics at the age of 22.

In 1897 he got his habilitation at the University of Göttingen in theoretical physics and in 1902 became extraordinary professor for theoretical physics at the University of Greifswald. In 1917 he became full professor for experimental physics at Martin Luther University of Halle-Wittenberg. In 1924 he became professor at the University of Freiburg, where he worked up to his retirement in 1935.

In Freiburg, during the Nazi dictatorship, Mie was member of the university opposition of the so-called "Freiburger Kreis" (Freiburg Circles) and one of the participants of the original "Freiburger Konzil".

He died at Freiburg im Breisgau in 1957.

Work

During his Greifswald years Mie worked on the computation of scattering of an electromagnetic wave by a homogeneous dielectric sphere, which was published in 1908 under the title of “Contributions to the optics of turbid media, particularly of colloidal metal solutions” in "Annalen der Physik". The term Mie scattering is still related to his name. Using Maxwell's electromagnetic theory applied to spherical gold particles Mie provided a theoretical treatment of plasmon resonance absorption of gold colloids. The sharp absorption bands depend on the particle size and explain the change in colour that occurs as the size of the colloid  nanoparticles is increased from 20 to 1600 nm. He wrote further important contributions to electromagnetism and also to relativity theory. In addition he was employed on measurements units and finally developed his Mie system of units in 1910 with the basic units Volt, Ampere, Coulomb and Second (VACS-system).

Honors

A crater on Mars was named in his honor, and also a building of the University of Freiburg as well as the Martin Luther University of Halle Wittenberg, where he first became a full professor, carries his name.

Selected publications 
 Moleküle, Atome, Weltäther. Teubner-Verlag, 1904.
 Moleküle, atome, Weltäther (Molecules, atoms, etheric world). BG Teubner, 1907.
 Die Einsteinsche Gravitationstheorie (Einstein's theory of gravitation). S. Hirzel, 1921.
 Die geistige Struktur der Physik. Gütersloh, 1934.
 Die göttliche Ordnung in der Natur. Furche-Verlag, 1946.
 Lehrbuch der Elektrizität und des Magnetismus. F. Enke, 1910; Enke-Verlag, 1943; Enke-Verlag, 1948.
 Die Grundlagen der Mechanik. Enke-Verlag, 1950.

See also
Classical unified field theories
Representative layer theory

References 

 Niels Goldschmidt: Die Entstehung der Freiburger Kreise. Historisch-Politische Mitteilungen 4 (1997), 1-17.
 Wolfram Hergert: Gustav Mie und Albert Einstein, Diskussionen zur Entwicklung der Allgemeinen Relativitätstheorie. Scientia Halensis 13 (2005) 3, 13-14.
 Eckhard John, Bernd Martin, Marc Mück, Hugo Ott (Hrsg.): Die Freiburger Universität in der Zeit des Nationalsozialismus. Ploetz, Freiburg, 1991.
 Gunter Kohl (Vorwort: David E. Rowe): Relativität in der Schwebe: Die Rolle von Gustav Mie. MPI für Wissenschaftsgeschichte, Berlin, 2002.
 

1868 births
1957 deaths
People from Rostock
Academic staff of the University of Greifswald
University of Rostock alumni
University of Göttingen alumni
20th-century German physicists